The 1970 Tour du Haut Var was the second edition of the Tour du Haut Var cycle race and was held on 2 March 1970. The race started in Nice and finished in Seillans. The race was won by René Grelin.

General classification

References

1970
1970 in road cycling
1970 in French sport
March 1970 sports events in Europe